Michael Krahulik (born September 25, 1977) is an American artist for the webcomic Penny Arcade and co-founder with Jerry Holkins of Child's Play, a charity that organizes toy drives for children's hospitals. He goes by the online moniker "Jonathan Gabriel" or "Gabe".  Krahulik does not physically resemble his comic strip counterpart, as the character was not originally meant to represent him.

Work 
Mike Krahulik credits cartoonist Stephen Silver as a major influence on his drawing style. His style has dramatically changed since he began drawing Penny Arcade in 1998.

Krahulik has done promotional comics for Tom Clancy's Rainbow Six and many other video games. He also provided the illustrations for the cover of Agent to the Stars by John Scalzi. In his early career he contributed artwork to the Daily Victim, a regular feature that used to run on GameSpy, totaling more than 300 illustrations. He has also designed and drawn advertisements, promotional artwork, and pre-order bonuses for several video games, including Assassin's Creed: Revelations, Uncharted 3: Drake's Deception, and others, mostly from Ubisoft. Krahulik and Penny Arcade writer Jerry Holkins have archived these projects and keep them within their web page.

Krahulik also portrays the infamous wizard Jim Darkmagic of the Newhamp Shire Darkmagics (a location deemed much more suitable by gamemaster Chris Perkins than regular New Hampshire) in Acquisitions Incorporated, a Dungeons and Dragons podcast/live show. Through this, he and Holkins had the opportunity to play the new release of Dungeons and Dragons Fourth Edition in Seattle for a day with Perkins from Wizards of the Coast, Scott Kurtz of PvP, and Wil Wheaton.

Publicity 
In 2005, Krahulik responded to an offer Jack Thompson made ("A Modest Video Game Proposal") requesting the creation of an ultra-violent game featuring a protagonist who murders video game developers. In Thompson's proposal, the protagonist would be motivated by the death of his son at the hands of a video-game-inspired teenager. Thompson claimed he would donate $10,000 USD towards a charity of then-current Take-Two Interactive chairman Paul Eibeler's choosing if such a game was made (which it eventually was). Krahulik, in the email, said he and fellow gamers had raised about half a million dollars toward charity. According to Krahulik, "Jack actually just called and screamed at me for a couple minutes. He said if I email him again I will 'regret it'. What a violent man." Krahulik, along with the rest of the Penny Arcade staff, later opted to "step in" for Jack Thompson. Thompson refused to donate $10,000 to charity because he considered the game put forth to meet his challenge subpar. He also claimed that his proposal was satirical and not a serious offer. Penny Arcade donated the money in his stead to the Entertainment Software Association with the note, "For Jack Thompson, because Jack Thompson won't".

Along with Holkins, Krahulik was included on the 2010 Time 100 for their work on Penny Arcade.

In 2010, Krahulik and Penny Arcade received criticism stemming from several controversial comics and statements with respect to the transgender community and rape, particularly in response to a comic featuring fictional creatures known as "dickwolves."  Krahulik and Holkins dismissed these criticisms, later selling "Team Dickwolves" T-shirts based on the strip. In June 2013, Krahulik apologized and donated $20,000 to LGBTQ youth suicide prevention group The Trevor Project.

In 2011, Krahulik provided a foreword for the book The Art and Making of Star Wars: The Old Republic, which was about the production of the massively multiplayer online role-playing game Star Wars: The Old Republic.

References

External links 

 
 

1977 births
Living people
American people of Ukrainian descent
Artists from Seattle
Artists from Spokane, Washington
American comics artists
Place of birth missing (living people)
Penny Arcade (webcomic)
American webcomic creators
Game Developers Conference Ambassador Award recipients